"The Road to the Churchyard" is a short story by Thomas Mann. Initially appeared in 1900 in Simplicissimus. Appeared in 1903 in an anthology of Mann's six short stories, entitled collectively as Six Novellen. Published after his death as part of Death in Venice and Other Stories.

This work parodies Naturalism (e.g. the alcoholism) and Mann's own Nietzschean influences. The recurrent protest present here in a comic vein, as well as in many other Mann's works, is against ignorant vitality epitomized here as the young boy on the bicycle.

Plot
The short story begins with a description of the gravel paved road to the churchyard, as well as of the half-paved highway running parallel to it. During the introduction sequence, various persons travelling it are described, such as soldiers marching, apprentices heading into town, or merchants travelling by cart.

The story then moves onto a physical description of the main character, Lobgott Piepsam. His wardrobe is described as a bit short for him, with sings of aging present of it, but overall, quite inconspicuous. His face is, on the contrary, memorable because of his nose. It is large, covered in marks and, in contrast to his pale face, red. The reason for his going to the church is given as well, he is heading to visit the graves of his wife and children. His children died young, as infants, and his wife died six months prior. His entire demeanor is that of grief, much more than that of a grieving husband and father. He is an alcoholic, without the support of a family.

Next, a young boy tries to pass him, only to be stopped when Lobgott threatens with a formal complaint to the city government, because he is driving a bike on the church road where that isn't permitted. The boy simply shrugs him off, and tries to drive off. Lobgott runs after him, grabs the rear side of the bike and cause that bike to overturn. The boy responds by punching him in the chest, and further threatening him, should he again stop him.

When the boy drives off, Lobgott proceeds to yell, cuss and scream uncontrollably at this perceived offense. A crowd gathers around him, of which he remains unaware, and in the end loses consciousness, with the ambulance driving him away.

Allegorical interpretation
The short story is an allegory for Life. Lobgott, who has suffered tragedy in his life, is headed to the cemetery. On the way there he, a self-destructive man, is intercepted by Life. This bothers Lobgott, who demands life take another way, but is ignored and a chase occurs. The chase can be interpreted as Lobgott trying to prevent Life from taking its course, to get it out of his way, or it can be interpreted as Lobgott expressing his wish to participate in it. Life escapes, Lobgott dies, and his body is unceremoniously shoved into the ambulance, as a loaf into an oven.

Characters
 Lobgott Piepsam - an alcoholic who recently lost his wife, children and his job. The representation of a rudimentary protest against vitality.  
 The Boy on the bicycle - called life in the short story, charges headlong, brutally pushing aside Lobgott. A trivialization of the blond beast, the embodiment of ruthless energy, Nietzsche's Übermensch.

English Translations 
 David Luke (1988)

References 

1900 short stories
Short stories by Thomas Mann
Works originally published in German magazines